The Sound of Urchin (Sound Of Urchin / SOU / TSOU / Urchin) is a musically diverse "outsider arena-rock" band from Brooklyn, New York and New Hope, Pennsylvania. SOU is known for their eclectic songs, for energetic, spontaneous live shows, and for their heavy touring schedule.

Band History

The Sound of Urchin's debut E.P. was released on lead-singer/drummer Tomato’s own independent label, Steven Records.

After further developing their style and sound, they signed to major label RCA Records and began working with Dean Ween of Ween. From 2000 to 2002, the band released two E.P.’s, The Orange E.P. (produced by Dean Ween) and the Jack And Diane E.P. (produced by Keith Cleversley of Flaming Lips and Hum fame), and their first full length album, You Are The Best (produced by Keith Cleversley), on RCA Records. In 2002, the band made a video for their song "Scary Skull Eyes". It was directed by Lorin Finkelstein and featured on MTV2’s 120 Minutes.

In 2005, The Sound of Urchin's second full length album The Diamond was released on Hybrid Recordings, and produced by Fountains Of Wayne's Adam Schlesinger, and mixed by Chris Shaw. The independent label is led by former A&M Records label head Al Cafaro and legendary concert promoter John Scher. SOU performed their best-known song from 2005, "There Are People In The Clouds", before nationwide audiences on CBS' The Late Late Show with Craig Ferguson,

In 2007 SOU released the "Rejoice (Limited Edition)" album, their 3rd full-length release, as a fans-only CD, to those who attended the Rejoice US Tour.  It was produced by Tomato and mixed by Josh Wilbur.  And features the lineup that included Tomato on vocals/drums, B-ILL and Robbie “Seahag” Mangano on lead guitars, and Michael Davidson on bass.  Rejoice also features vocal legend Ellen Foley (Meatloaf, The Clash) on the song “The Rooster Says Good Morning”.

2014 saw the vinyl-only release of the 4th full length Urchin album, "Black Castle", on Tucson AZ's Baby Gas Mask Records.  Black Castle was produced by Tomato and showcases a more experimental studio/home-recording hybrid sound.

In 2015, Urchin released the full length "The WoozyFly Sessions" album, which were live-in-the-studio recordings of live show staples of the Rejoice-era line-up.

2017 saw the re-release of both "The Diamond" album as "The Diamond Deluxe", and the "Jack And Diane E.P." as "Jack And Diane Deluxe", as extended albums with unreleased recordings from each era as bonus tracks.

2019 saw the official release of the "Rejoice" album on Tomato's Steven Records, with the bonus “Rock n’ Roll is True E.P." as extended tracks;  and also saw the official release of the "Black Castle" album on Tomato's Steven Records in 2019, with the bonus “The Crypt E.P." as extended tracks.

Touring History and Affiliations

The Sound of Urchin are Zelig-esque chameleons of rock, as their diverse style has gained them entrance into likewise diverse rock circles. For example, over the years SOU has toured with bands like Tenacious D, Ween, Dio/Deep Purple/Scorpions, Cracker, Mike Watt, Slightly Stoopid, Fishbone, The North Mississippi Allstars, The Urge, SR-71, Trik Turner, Bargain Music, The Ziggens, as well as sharing stages with Public Enemy, Twisted Sister, Slash's Snakepit, Dick Dale, Butthole Surfers, Everclear, Project/Object, Vernon Reid, Lit, 2 Skinnee J's, Cobra Verde, and Local H.

Urchin has had a long affiliation with the band Ween; Dean Ween has been a mentor to the band and produced their first major label release The Orange E.P., Tomato and B-ILL play in Dean Ween and Guy Heller's Moistboyz (featured on the "Live Jihad" DVD release) and have played with Ween, Dean Ween's Tenderloin and toured with the Dean Ween Group in 2018. B-ILL also played guitar on Ween's “The Mollusk” album, and Tomato plays drums with Ween's bassist Dave Dreiwitz, as a duo called Crescent Moon.

They have also collaborated with Tenacious D;  Urchin was the opening act on their 2001 tour, and Tomato played drums with them for their 2002 Comedy Central Crank Yankers recording of “Friendship”.

Members

Current members
 Tomato (Chris Harfenist) – drums, lead vocal
 Reverend B-ILL (Bill Fowler) – lead guitar, main backup vocal

Side members
 Black Sebabbitt (Jack Krause) – co-writer, character vocals
 Mr. Richard Rickles (Wayne Price) – tambourine, dancer
 Jah Rob (Rob Marcario) - artwork
 Johnny Stees (Jason Pietropaulo) - Greek runs, tour manager, ruling the night

Live members
 Jordan Shapiro - keyboard
 Chris Shepherd - lead guitar
 Conor Kinsman – bass
 Matt Holloman - lead guitar
 Brian Ellingham - bass

Past members
 Doo Doo Brown (Chris Huetz) – bass, backup vocal
 Hollywood Scotty Choc (Scott Heydt) – lead guitar, backup vocal
 Barbie Smooth (Mike Huetz) – producer, guitar
 Seahag (Robbie Mangano) - lead guitar, bass, backup vocal
 Michael Davidson – bass
 Josh Musto - guitar, backup vocal
 Karina Rykman - guitar, bass, keyboards

Discography

Early pre-official SOU 4-track albums (1994-1998)

Official SOU Studio albums (1998–present)

References

Alternative rock groups from New York (state)
Musical groups from Pennsylvania